The following is a list of most watched Canadian television broadcasts of 2019 according to Numeris.

Most watched by week

References

Canadian television-related lists
2019 in Canadian television